Moroccan–Spanish conflicts:

Conquest of Mehdya (1681)
Siege of Larache (1689)
Siege of Melilla (1774)
Siege of Ceuta (1790-1791)
Hispano-Moroccan War (1859–1860)
First Melillan campaign (1893–1894)
Second Melillan campaign (1909–1910)
Kert campaign (1911–1912)
Rif War (1920–1926)
Ifni War (1957–1958)
Perejil Island crisis (2002)

Wars involving Morocco
Morocco–Spain relations
Wars involving Spain